Pieter van Bleiswijk (1724, Delft – 29 October 1790, The Hague) was grand pensionary of Holland from 1 December 1772 to November 1787. He was an opponent of  Duke Louis Ernest of Brunswick-Lüneburg, the main adviser of Prince William V of Orange. He was deposed during the Prussian invasion of the United Provinces in 1787.

References 

1724 births
1790 deaths
Grand Pensionaries
People from Delft